The 2001 NCAA Division I-AA Football Championship Game was a postseason college football game between the Montana Grizzlies and the Furman Paladins. The game was played on December 21, 2001, at Finley Stadium, home field of the University of Tennessee at Chattanooga. The culminating game of the 2001 NCAA Division I-AA football season, it was won by Montana, 13–6.

Teams
The participants of the Championship Game were the finalists of the 2001 I-AA Playoffs, which began with a 16-team bracket. In a change from recent postseasons, the NCAA seeded only the top four seeds, while placing other teams in the bracket based on geographical considerations in order to minimize travel.

Montana Grizzlies

Montana finished their regular season with an 11–1 record (7–0 in conference); their only loss was to Hawaii of Division I-A. Seeded first in the playoffs, the Grizzlies defeated Northwestern State, Sam Houston State, and Northern Iowa to reach the final. This was the fourth appearance for Montana in a Division I-AA championship game, having won in 1995, and having lost in 1996 and 2000.

Furman Paladins

Furman finished their regular season with a 9–2 record (7–1 in conference); one of their losses was to Wyoming of Division I-A. The Paladins, seeded third, defeated Western Kentucky, Lehigh, and second-seed Georgia Southern to reach the final. This was the third appearance for Furman in a Division I-AA championship game, having won in 1988 and having lost in 1985.

Game summary

Scoring summary

 When there is no time left on the clock at the end of the fourth quarter, NCAA rules only allow for a conversion attempt if it could affect the outcome of the game.

Game statistics

References

Further reading

External links
#23 - Montana Wins the 2001 National Championship | Big Sky 50 Greatest Moments via YouTube

Championship Game
NCAA Division I Football Championship Games
Furman Paladins football games
Montana Grizzlies football games
College football in Tennessee
American football competitions in Chattanooga, Tennessee
NCAA Division I-AA Football Championship Game
NCAA Division I-AA Football Championship Game